The legislative districts of Sulu are the representations of the province of Sulu in the various national legislatures of the Philippines. The province is currently represented in the lower house of the Congress of the Philippines through its first and second congressional districts.

History 

Initially being excluded from representation in the lower house of the Philippine Legislature in 1907, the then-non-Christian-majority areas of the Philippines — which included the Department of Mindanao and Sulu, of which Sulu (including what is now Tawi-Tawi) was part — were finally extended legislative representation with the passage of the Philippine Autonomy Act in 1916 by the United States Congress. The Revised Administrative Code (Act No. 2711) enacted on March 10, 1917 further elaborated on the manner by which these areas would be represented. The non-Christian areas were to be collectively represented in the upper house's 12th senatorial district by two senators, both appointed by the Governor-General. Five assembly members, also appointed by the Governor-General, were to represent the seven component provinces of Department of Mindanao and Sulu — Agusan, Bukidnon, Cotabato, Davao, Lanao, Sulu and Zamboanga — in the lower house as a single at-large district.

These arrangements remained in place despite the abolition of the Department in 1920. It lasted until 1935, when each of the seven provinces was provided a single representative to the National Assembly of the Philippines, albeit the manner of election varying between provinces. Voters of the more Christianized provinces of Agusan, Bukidnon, Davao and Zamboanga could elect their representative through popular vote by virtue of Article VI, Section 1 of the 1935 Constitution. In the Muslim-dominated provinces of Cotabato, Lanao and Sulu, however, voter qualifications were more restrictive: the only persons allowed to vote for the province's representative were past and present municipal officials (municipal president, vice-president, municipal councilors); present senators, assembly representatives and 1935 Constitutional Convention delegates; provincial governors and members of provincial boards; and any persons currently residing in the concerned province who held any of the aforementioned positions in the past. This was the manner by which Sulu's representative was elected in 1935.

The 1st National Assembly of the Philippines passed Commonwealth Act No. 44 on October 13, 1936 to finally give all qualified voters of Sulu (along with Cotabato and Lanao) the right to elect their own representatives through popular vote.  Voters began to elect their representatives in this manner beginning in 1938.

In the disruption caused by the Second World War, the Province of Sulu sent two delegates to the National Assembly of the Japanese-sponsored Second Philippine Republic: one was the provincial governor (an ex officio member), while the other was elected through a provincial assembly of KALIBAPI members during the Japanese occupation of the Philippines. Upon the restoration of the Philippine Commonwealth in 1945 the province retained its pre-war lone congressional district.

Sulu (excluding Tawi-Tawi, which became a separate province in 1973) was represented in the Interim Batasang Pambansa as part of Region IX from 1978 to 1984. The province returned one representative, elected at large, to the Regular Batasang Pambansa in 1984.

Under the new Constitution which was proclaimed on February 11, 1987, the province was reapportioned into two congressional districts; each elected its member to the restored House of Representatives starting that same year.

Tawi-Tawi last formed part of its representation in 1972.

1st District 

Municipalities: Hadji Panglima Tahil (Marunggas), Indanan, Jolo, Maimbung, Pangutaran, Parang, Patikul, Talipao
Population (2020): 585,458

Notes

2nd District 

Municipalities: Banguingui (Tongkil), Kalingalan Caluang, Lugus, Luuk, Old Panamao, Omar, Pandami, Panglima Estino (New Panamao), Pata, Siasi, Tapul
Population (2020): 414,650

Lone District (defunct) 

 includes the present-day province of Tawi-Tawi

Notes

At-Large (defunct)

1943–1944 
 includes the present-day province of Tawi-Tawi

1984–1986

See also 
Legislative districts of Mindanao and Sulu
Legislative district of Tawi-Tawi

References 

Sulu
Politics of Sulu